Welterweight is a weight class in combat sports. Originally the term "welterweight" was used only in boxing, but other combat sports like Muay Thai, taekwondo, and mixed martial arts also use it for their own weight division system to classify the opponents. In most sports that use it, welterweight is heavier than lightweight but lighter than middleweight.

Etymology
The first known instance of the term is from 1831, meaning "heavyweight horseman," later "boxer or wrestler of a certain weight" by 1896. This sense comes from earlier "welter" "heavyweight horseman or boxer" from 1804, possibly from "welt", meaning "to beat severely", from  15th century.

Boxing

Professional boxing
A professional welterweight boxer's weight is greater than 140 pounds (≈63 kg), but no more than 147 pounds (≈67 kg).

Current world champions

Current champions

Current world rankings

The Ring
As of December, 10, 2022.

Keys:
 Current The Ring world champion

BoxRec

.

Longest reigning world welterweight champions
Below is a list of longest reigning welterweight champions in boxing measured by the individual's longest reign. Career total time as champion (for multiple time champions) does not apply.

Top 10 most title defenses
Below is a list of most title defenses of welterweight champions in boxing measured by the individual's reign with the most title defenses. Career total title defenses as champion (for multiple time champions) does not apply.

Amateur boxing

Olympic champions

Kickboxing
The weight division system is different in each organisation, so the kickboxing weight divisions of some international organizations vary:
International Kickboxing Federation (IKF), welterweight (Pro & Amateur) .
International Sport Karate Association (ISKA), welterweight . 
World Kickboxing Association (WKA), welterweight (Pro) upper limit .
ONE Championship, welterweight upper limit .

Bare-knuckle boxing 
The limit for welterweight generally differs among promotions in bare-knuckle boxing:

Mixed martial arts

Current champions
This table is not always up to date. Last updated March 18, 2023.

Other sports
Other sports to include a welterweight division include the following,
 Muay Thai has fixed its weight division similarly to boxing. 
 International Kickboxing Federation (IKF): Muay Thai Welterweight (Pro & Amateur) 142.1-147 lb or 64.59-66.8 kg
 World Muay Thai Council (WMC), welterweight range is from 140 to 147 lb or 63.5 to 66.6 kg

References

External links

Boxing weight classes
Kickboxing weight classes
Professional wrestling weight classes
Taekwondo weight classes
Wrestling weight classes